is a quarterly Japanese fashion mook which focuses on the Gothic and Lolita fashions. It was first published in 2001 by Index Communications, and is a spin-off of the Japanese fashion magazine Kera.

In February 2008, an English-language version was released in North America by Tokyopop. English-language critics praised the Gothic & Lolita Bible as an entertaining magazine with nice pictures and content. It was discontinued after 5 issues in Spring 2009.

History
First published in 2001 by Index Communications, the Gothic & Lolita Bible is a spin-off of the Japanese fashion magazine Kera. The founder was Mariko Suzuki. It is a "mook", the combination of a book and magazine. The Japanese musician Mana originally proposed the creation of the Gothic & Lolita Bible and along with Kana, a Japanese singer-songwriter, helped to promote the magazine and the Lolita fashion by dressing in the fashion while performing. Essays by Japanese author Takemoto Novala about "the proper behavior and attitudes" of girls also influenced many to join the Lolita fashion and lifestyle. Most of the Gothic & Lolita Bible focuses on the Lolita fashion as it is "the more popular of the two fashions".

The idea of publishing the Gothic & Lolita Bible in North America was first suggested in 2003. In June 2007, Tokopop announced the decision to publish an English-language version and released the first volume in February 2008. It contained articles from past issues, which the editors chose based on available material, and original content. Beginning with the second volume, the English-language Gothic & Lolita Bible features articles, short stories, and interviews that originally ran in the Japanese version a year ago, along with original content about the fashion, events, and trends in the United States.

Reception
Gothic & Lolita Bible ranked tenth in About.com's  2008 reader poll for the best manga magazine or magazine and book hybrids. It received positive reviews from English-language critics. About.com's Deb Aoki listed it as the 11th most anticipated manga for 2008. Active Anime's Sandra Scholes wrote: "Superb, this is an essential buy for any Lolita's bookshelf!" While noting some "dated" content and that it "isn't a serious scholarly journal", Danielle Van Gorder of Mania Entertainment praised the magazine as "gorgeous glossy mook that should satisfy both the casual fan of lolita fashion as well as the most discriminating sweet lolita princess." Writing for Coolstreak Cartoons, Leroy Douresseaux commented on the "lovely photographs" of the Gothic and Lolita models and called it "a photographic art mook from "The Twilight Zone" via A Clockwork Orange, Dangerous Liaisons, Mad Max, etc." In March 2017, Gothic & Lolita Bible announced they would be going on hiatus May 24, 2017 after 16 years of publication.

Issues

Japanese language edition
There were a total of 63 regular issues and 5 special issues.

 Many times there are differences between the release date from the publisher's website and the publication date printed on the issue itself. Dates marked with a * are dates printed on the back cover of the issue.

English language edition

References

External links
Gothic & Lolita Bible at Tokyopop's website 

2001 establishments in Japan
Defunct women's magazines published in Japan
Fashion magazines published in Japan
Lolita fashion
Magazines established in 2001
Magazines published in Tokyo
Quarterly magazines
Women's fashion magazines